Abu Ishaq Ibrahim, also known as Ishaq ibn Alp-Tegin, was a Turkic officer, who was the Samanid governor of Ghazna from September 963 to November 966. He was the son and successor of Alp-Tegin.

Abu Ishaq Ibrahim briefly lost control of Ghazna after an invasion by its former ruler, Abu Bakr Lawik. However, he managed to regain it with Samanid aid. Some time later, Abu Ishaq Ibrahim died and was succeeded by a Turkic slave commander named Bilgetegin.

Sources
 
 
 
 

10th-century births
966 deaths
Ghilman
Slaves of the Samanid Empire
10th-century Turkic people
Samanid governors of Ghazna